The 1893–94 Welsh Amateur Cup was the fourth season of the Welsh Amateur Cup. The cup was won by Mold Red Stars who defeated Wrockwardine Wood 4-3 in the final, at Stansty Park, Wrexham.

First round

Second round

Third round

Semi-final

Final

References

1893-94
Welsh Cup
1893–94 domestic association football cups